Daniel Nestor and Édouard Roger-Vasselin were the defending champions, but chose not to compete together. Nestor played alongside Vasek Pospisil, but lost in the semifinals to Ivan Dodig and Marcelo Melo. Roger-Vasselin teamed up with Julien Benneteau, but lost in the first round to Milos Raonic and Nenad Zimonjić.

Dodig and Melo won the title, defeating Jean-Julien Rojer and Horia Tecău in the final, 7–6(7–5), 6–7(5–7), [10–6].

Seeds
All seeds received a bye into the second round.

Draw

Finals

Top half

Bottom half

References
Main Draw

Western and Southern Open Doubles
2016 Western & Southern Open